Ranularia caudata, common name the bent-neck triton,  is a species of predatory sea snail, a marine gastropod mollusk in the family Cymatiidae.

Description
The size of a shell of an adult snail varies between 38 mm and 94 mm.

Distribution
This species is distributed in the Indo-West Pacific along Tanzania.

References

External links
 

Cymatiidae
Gastropods described in 1791